Mohesh Chai is an Indian politician from the state of Arunachal Pradesh. Mohesh Chai was elected from the Tezu constituency in the 2014 Arunachal Pradesh Legislative Assembly election, standing as an BJP candidate. Prior to joining politics he was a doctor in the Govt of Arunachal Pradesh with MD in chest and respiratory diseases. He completed his schooling from Govt Higher Secondary School, Tezu. He then did his MBBS from Ambedkar Medical College, Bengaluru. After practising as a doctor in the Govt of AP for many years, he went for his masters and completed his MD in chest and respiratory diseases from Regional Institute of Medical Sciences, Imphal. He is also selected as a cabinet minister for Arunachal Pradesh Govt. in 2017.

He is the son of Late Shri Tankakso Chai and Smt Jahilu Chai.

Currently Mohesh Chai also holds Veterinary, Animal Husbandry, sports & Youth Affairs, Horticulture, Agriculture Ministry of Arunachal Pradesh.

See also
Arunachal Pradesh Legislative Assembly

References

External links
Mohesh Chai profile
MyNeta Profile
Janpratinidhi 

Living people
Bharatiya Janata Party politicians from Arunachal Pradesh
Arunachal Pradesh MLAs 2014–2019
State cabinet ministers of Arunachal Pradesh
Year of birth missing (living people)